The following is a list of notable deaths in October 1989.

Entries for each day are listed alphabetically by surname. A typical entry lists information in the following sequence:
 Name, age, country of citizenship at birth, subsequent country of citizenship (if applicable), reason for notability, cause of death (if known), and reference.

October 1989

2
Paola Barbara, 77, Italian actress. 
Vittorio Caprioli, 68, Italian actor, film director, and screenwriter, heart attack.
Cousin Joe, 81, American singer.

4
Graham Chapman, 48, British actor and comedian (Monty Python), oropharyngeal cancer.
Betsy King Ross, 68, American actress.
Secretariat, 19, American thoroughbred racehorse, euthanized.

6
Bette Davis, 81, American actress (All About Eve, Dangerous, Jezebel), Oscar winner (1936, 1939), breast cancer.

11
M. King Hubbert, 86, American geologist and geophysicist, (Hubbert curve, Hubbert peak theory), pulmonary embolism.
Paul Shenar, 53, American actor (Scarface, The Secret of NIMH, Raw Deal), co-founder of the American Conservatory Theater, HIV/AIDS.

12
Jay Ward, 69, American animator and television producer (The Adventures of Rocky and Bullwinkle and Friends, George of the Jungle, Crusader Rabbit), renal cancer.

14
Michael Carmine, 30, American actor (Batteries Not Included, Leviathan, Search for Tomorrow), heart attack.

15
James Lee Barrett, 59, American screenwriter (The Greatest Story Ever Told, Smokey and the Bandit, The Truth About Spring), cancer.
Scott O'Dell, 91, American novelist (Island of the Blue Dolphins, The King's Fifth, Sing Down the Moon), prostate cancer.

16
Cornel Wilde, 77,  Hungarian-born American actor (A Song to Remember) and film director (The Naked Prey, No Blade of Grass), leukemia.

18
Countess Georgina von Wilczek, 67, Austrian royal, Princess of Liechtenstein.

19
Alan Murphy, 35, British session guitarist (Level 42, Kate Bush, Go West), complications from HIV/AIDS.

20
Sir Anthony Quayle, 76, British actor (Anne of the Thousand Days, Lawrence of Arabia, The Guns of Navarone), Emmy winner (1975), liver cancer.

22
Ewan MacColl, 74, British singer-songwriter and labor activist, complications following heart surgery.
Jacob Wetterling, 11, American murder victim.
Roland Winters, 84, American actor (Charlie Chan), stroke.

25
Mary McCarthy, 77, American novelist, critic, and political activist, lung cancer.

26
Charles J. Pedersen, 85, Korean-born American organic chemist, Nobel Prize laureate (1987), multiple myeloma.

28
Yuliya Solntseva, 88, Soviet actress and film director.

30
Pedro Vargas, 83, Mexican tenor and actor, diabetes.

References

Sources 
 

1989-10
 10